Hidden Gems is a 2015 compilation album by Swedish pop group Ace of Base. It was released worldwide by 
Playground Music on March 6, 2015.

Background
The album consists of previously unreleased material and b-sides recorded by the original lineup between 1991 through 2006. The majority of the songs were previously released through the band's Facebook page during Ace Thursdays, though some of the tracks on the compilation feature updated production. Five of the included songs were previously released years prior as b-sides and bonus tracks. 

"No Good Lover," included on this compilation, was originally meant to be a single from Flowers, but later did not make the cut for the album. A previously unreleased version of "Hey Darling," a track which first appeared on Da Capo, is included on Hidden Gems as an iTunes bonus track. "Sunset in Southern California" was re-worked and later released on The Golden Ratio in 2010 as "Southern California." A demo version of "Giving It Up" is featured as a bonus track on the 2015 remastered release of Happy Nation U.S. Version.

Release
The album was released on CD and vinyl worldwide through the band's official website and through digital retailers on March 6, 2015. Two songs from the album, "Would You Believe" and "Into the Night of Blue," were made available through digital retailers prior to the album's release. The iTunes edition contains two additional songs as bonus tracks. Jonas Berggren stated on the band's official Facebook page that a second edition with different songs has been considered.

In 2019, the collection Greatest Hits from 2008 was repackaged with Hidden Gems instead of the music video DVD and was released as Ace Of Base – Gold.

Hidden Gems, Vol. 2
A follow-up to Hidden Gems, Hidden Gems, Vol. 2 was released as part of the All That She Wants: The Classic Collection (2020) box set. It was later released to digital platforms on 28 August 2020.

Track listing

Hidden Gems, Vol. 1
All songs were previously unreleased, unless otherwise specified.

Hidden Gems, Vol. 2
All songs were previously unreleased.

Release history

References

External links
 Hidden Gems – Ace of Base official web site

2015 compilation albums
Ace of Base compilation albums
B-side compilation albums